The Rappahannock River Valley National Wildlife Refuge is a National Wildlife Refuge in Eastern Virginia that was established in 1996. It is managed by the United States Fish and Wildlife Service.

The refuge is based in Warsaw, Virginia. It comprises several non-contiguous units along the Rappahannock River in King George, Caroline, Essex, Westmoreland, and Richmond counties. The majority of the units are in Richmond County.

Rappahannock River Valley is part of the Eastern Virginia Rivers National Wildlife Refuge Complex. The complex comprises four refuges:

 Rappahannock River Valley National Wildlife Refuge
 Presquile National Wildlife Refuge
 James River National Wildlife Refuge
 Plum Tree Island National Wildlife Refuge

References

FWR page

External links
Rappahannock River Valley National Wildlife Refuge

Protected areas of Caroline County, Virginia
Protected areas of Essex County, Virginia
Protected areas of King George County, Virginia
National Wildlife Refuges in Virginia
Protected areas of Richmond County, Virginia
Protected areas of Westmoreland County, Virginia
Protected areas established in 1996
1996 establishments in Virginia
Rappahannock River